The 2018–2019 education workers' strikes in the United States began on February 22, 2018, after local activists compelled the West Virginia state leadership of the West Virginia branches of the American Federation of Teachers and the National Education Association into holding a strike vote. The strike—which ended when teachers returned to their classrooms on March 7—inspired similar, statewide strikes in Oklahoma and Arizona. It also inspired smaller-scale protests by school staff in Kentucky, North Carolina, Colorado, and led to a school bus driver strike in Georgia. Additionally, around this time, adjunct professors at Virginia Commonwealth University in Richmond, Virginia protested over pay.

The strikes continued in the fall of 2018 when there was a collective bargaining shortcoming between the United Teachers Los Angeles union and the Los Angeles Unified School District in September 2018, prompting a strike that began in January 2019. This also resulted in a teachers' walkout in Virginia, a long-time right-to-work state, as well as in Denver and Oakland, California. The national wave of strikes has been referred to as Red for Ed or #RedforEd, with striking workers often wearing red shirts to show solidarity. Reasons given for the choice of the color red range from the fact that many of the initial strikes were in red (Republican-controlled) states to the idea that public school budgets are in the red.

Motivations for the strikes included desire for increased wages for teachers and support staff, larger school budgets, smaller classrooms, and other issues. The strikes varied in their levels of success, with the West Virginia strike considered mostly successful, where Oklahoman teachers received relatively few concessions.

Origins and overview

Discussions of a strike in West Virginia began in early 2018. In the first week of February, teachers staged "walk-ins" at schools and some protested at the West Virginia Capitol. The strike proved successful, and inspired those in other states to strike as well.

In early April, Oklahoma became the second state to strike, making it the first time a teacher's strike was held in the state since 1990. The strike lasted for 10 days, from April 2–12, after teacher salaries were increased by $6,000 and support staff salaries were increased by $1,250.

In late April, teachers in Arizona and in Colorado went on strike. The Colorado strike began on April 27 and ended on May 12, while the Arizona Strike lasted from April 26 to May 3.

In May 2018, it was reported that teachers in North Carolina could be next to strike, making it the fifth state to have a teachers' strike. This was due to the state being ranked 41st in the nation in salaries for teachers, and per pupil spending at negative 12 percent. Further, it was reported that teachers in North Carolina have seen a five percent decrease in salaries since 2008. Furthermore, teachers hired after January 1, 2021, will not receive health benefits, along with teachers having to pay $10,000 per year in out of pocket health insurance.

Because of a majority of the strikes being in predominantly Republican Party-controlled, conservative states, the strikes have been referred to as the "Red State Revolt". This has prompted several Republican politicians to concede to their demands, in the run-up to the 2018 mid-term elections.

Pension costs
One of the largest reasons for decreasing teacher pay and less funding for schools is the large amount of money diverted from current budgets to pay educators' unfunded pension liabilities.

For example: "In Colorado, school district payments to the public pension fund have roughly doubled since 2006, from about 10 percent of payroll to 20 percent."

A 2016 study found that only 30% of the money that school districts pay towards the retirement benefits of an educator actually go toward that educator's pension, with 70% being used to pay off unfunded debt in that pension system.

Demands
Universally, demands included raising pay. In Oklahoma and West Virginia, respectively sources of oil and coal, demands included  financing the increased spending on education through taxation focused on these industries.

Original reason for the strike included the state's plan to force teachers to use fitbit to be allowed to keep subscribing to the same healthplan or face a $500 annual fine.

Strikes

Summary of strikes and protests by location

Major events

Arizona

Colorado

Los Angeles

North Carolina

Oklahoma

West Virginia

See also
 2018 Colorado teachers' strike
 2018 DeKalb County School District bus drivers' strike
 2018 North Carolina teachers' strike
 2018 West Virginia teachers' strike
 VCUarts adjunct workers' protests
 Labor history of the United States

References

2018 labor disputes and strikes
2019 labor disputes and strikes
Education labor disputes in the United States
Labor disputes in the United States
February 2018 events in the United States
March 2018 events in the United States